Johann Sebastian Bach composed the church cantata  (I had much grief), 21 in Weimar, possibly in 1713, partly even earlier. He used it in 1714 and later for the third Sunday after Trinity of the liturgical year. The work marks a transition between motet style on biblical and hymn text to operatic recitatives and arias on contemporary poetry.

The text is probably written by the court poet Salomon Franck, who includes four biblical quotations from three psalms and from the Book of Revelation, and juxtaposes in one movement biblical text with two stanzas from Georg Neumark's hymn "Wer nur den lieben Gott lässt walten". The cantata possibly began as a work of dialogue and four motets on biblical verses. When Bach performed the cantata again in Leipzig in 1723, it was structured in eleven movements, including an opening sinfonia and additional recitatives and arias. It is divided in two parts to be performed before and after the sermon, and scored for three vocal soloists (soprano, tenor, and bass), a four-part choir, and a Baroque instrumental ensemble of three trumpets, timpani, oboe, strings and continuo.

Bach led a performance in the court chapel of Schloss Weimar on 17 June 1714, known as the Weimar version. He revised the work for performances, possibly in Hamburg and several revivals in Leipzig, adding for the first Leipzig version four trombones playing colla parte.

History and words 

Bach composed the cantata in Weimar, but the composition history is complicated and not at all stages certain. Findings by Martin Petzoldt suggest that the cantata began with the later movements 2–6 and 9–10, most of them on biblical text, performed at a memorial service of Aemilia Maria Haress, the wife of a former prime-minister of Schwarzburg-Rudolstadt, at the church St. Peter und Paul in Weimar on 8 October 1713. Bach may then have expanded it and presented it for his application in December 1713 at the Liebfrauenkirche in Halle. The performance material of this event, the only surviving source, shows on the title page the designation , indicating that the cantata with its general readings and texts is suitable for any occasion.

Bach designated the cantata to the Third Sunday after Trinity of 1714. The prescribed readings for the Sunday were from the First Epistle of Peter, "Cast thy burden upon the Lord", and from the Gospel of Luke, the parable of the Lost Sheep and the parable of the Lost Coin. The text shows little connection to the prescribed gospel, but is related to the epistle reading. The poet included biblical texts for four movements: for movement 2 , for movement 6 , translated in the King James Version (KJV) to "Why art thou cast down, O my soul? and why art thou disquieted in me? hope thou in God: for I shall yet praise him for the help of his countenance.", for movement 9  (KJV: "Return unto thy rest, O my soul; for the Lord hath dealt bountifully with thee."), and for movement 11 , "Worthy is the Lamb", the text also chosen to conclude Handel's Messiah. Only movement 9 uses text from a hymn, juxtaposing the biblical text with stanzas 2 and 5 of "" by Georg Neumark, who published it with his own melody in Jena in 1657 in the collection . Possibly the first version of the cantata ended with that movement.

The so-called Weimar version, his first composition for an ordinary Sunday in the second half of the liturgical year, marked also a farewell to Duke Johann Ernst who began a journey then. A revision occurred during the Köthen years, specifically in 1720. A performance, documented by original parts, could have been in Hamburg to apply for the position as organist at St. Jacobi in November 1720, this time in nine movements and in D minor instead of C minor. As  in Leipzig, Bach performed the cantata again on his third Sunday in office on 13 June 1723, as the title page shows. For this performance, now of eleven movements beginning again in C minor, he also changed the instrumentation, adding for example four trombones to double the voices in the fifth stanza of the hymn. This version was used in several revivals during Bach's lifetime and is mostly played today.

Music

Scoring and structure 
Bach structured the cantata in eleven movements in two parts, Part I (movements 1–6) to be performed before the sermon, Part II (7–11) after the sermon. He scored it for three vocal soloists (soprano (S), tenor (T) and bass (B)), a four-part choir SATB, three trumpets (Tr) and  timpani only in the final movement, four trombones (Tb) (only in Movement 9 and only in the 5th version to double voices in the fifth stanza of the chorale), oboe (Ob), two violins (Vl), viola (Va), and basso continuo (Bc), with bassoon (Fg) and organ (Org) explicitly indicated. The duration is given as 44 minutes.

In the following table of the movements, the scoring and keys are given for the version performed in Leipzig in 1723. The keys and time signatures are taken from Alfred Dürr, using the symbol for common time (4/4). The instruments are shown separately for winds and strings, while the continuo, playing throughout, is not shown.

Movements 

The music for this early cantata uses motet style in the choral movements. Biblical words are used in a prominent way. They are treated in choral movements, different from other cantatas of the Weimar period where they were typically composed as recitatives. John Eliot Gardiner, who conducted all of Bach's church cantatas in 2000 as the Bach Cantata Pilgrimage, termed the cantata "one of the most extraordinary and inspired of Bach's vocal works".

Part I 
Themes of deep suffering, pain and mourning  dominate the music in the first part of the cantata. Gardiner notes that five of the six movements are "set almost obsessively in C minor".

1 
The work is opened by a Sinfonia similar to the one of the cantata , possibly the slow movement of a concerto for oboe and violin. A sighing motif, the picture of a storm of tears, and the flood image conjured by the upwelling music characterizes the dark and oppressive feeling.

2 
The first vocal movement is a choral motet on the psalm verse "" (I had much trouble in my heart). The music has two contrasting sections, following the contrast of the psalm verse which continues "" (but your consolations revive my soul). The word "" (I) is repeated several times, followed by a fugal section.

3 
The soprano aria "" (Sighs, tears, anguish, trouble) is one of the first arias in Italian style in a Bach cantata, accompanied by an obbligato oboe.

4 
The tenor sings in accompanied recitative with the strings "" (What? have You therefore, my God,).

5 
The tenor, accompanied by the strings, intensifies the mood: "" (Streams of salty tears).

6 
A consoling verse from a psalm is treated as a closing motet of Part I: "" (Why do you trouble yourself, my soul). Alfred Dürr analyzes in detail how different means of expression follow the text closely, with shifts in tempo and texture, culminating in a "permutation fugue of remarkably logical structure"  on the final "" (for being the help of my countenance and my God).

Part II 

The second part begins in a different mood, through the trust of sinners in the grace of God. In a recitative and an aria, the Soul (soprano) and Jesus (bass as the voice of Christ) enter a dialogue, leading to a final choral movement as a strong hymn of praise.

7 
Soprano and bass enter a dialogue in accompanied recitative with the strings. The Soul asks: "" (Ah, Jesus, my peace, my light, where are You?). Dialogue was common in Protestant church music from the 17th century but is especially dramatic here.

8 

Soprano and bass unite in an aria: "" (Come, my Jesus, and revive / Yes, I come and revive), accompanied only by the continuo. It resembles passionate love duets from contemporary opera.

9 

In a movement unusual in Bach works, which originally concluded the cantata, biblical text from a psalm, "" (Be at peace again, my soul), is juxtaposed with two stanzas from Georg Neumark's hymn, stanza 2, "" (What good are heavy worries?), and stanza 5, "" (Think not, in your heat of despair,)  The first hymn stanza is sung by the tenor to solo voices rendering the biblical text. In the second stanza the soprano has the melody, the voices are doubled by a choir of trombones introduced in the Leipzig version of 1723.

10 
The tenor aria "" (Rejoice, soul, rejoice, heart), accompanied only by the continuo, was added late to the cantata. Dürr describes the mood as "spirited exited abandon".

11 
The concluding movement is a motet on a quotation from Revelation, "" (The Lamb, that was slain). Three trumpets and timpani appear only in this triumphant movements of praise. It begins in homophony and expresses the text "" (Glory and honour and praise and power) in another permutation fugue with a climax in the subject played by the first trumpet.

Recordings 
A list of recordings is provided on the Bach Cantatas Website. Ensembles playing period instruments in historically informed performance are marked by a green background.

References

External links 
 Ich hatte viel Bekümmernis, BWV 21: performance by the Netherlands Bach Society (video and background information)
 
 Ich hatte viel Bekümmernis (1st version) BWV 21; BC A 99a / Sacred cantata (3rd Sunday after Trinity), Bach Digital
 Ich hatte viel Bekümmernis (2nd version) BWV 21; BC A 99a / Sacred cantata (3rd Sunday after Trinity), Bach Digital
 Ich hatte viel Bekümmernis (3rd version) BWV 21; BC A 99a / Sacred cantata (3rd Sunday after Trinity), Bach Digital

Church cantatas by Johann Sebastian Bach
1713 compositions
Psalm-related compositions by Johann Sebastian Bach